James Albert Redman,  (born 8 November 1931) is a British-born Zimbabwean former professional motorcycle racer. He competed in Grand Prix motorcycle racing from 1959 to 1966. Redman is notable for being a six-time Grand Prix road racing world champion. In 2012, Redman was named an FIM Legend for his motorcycling achievements.

History

Born in London, England, he emigrated to Rhodesia (now Zimbabwe) in 1952, where he began his racing career. He met with John Love who was changing from motorcycle racing to single-seat cars. Redman enthusiastically helped Love prepare and maintain his Cooper F3 with a Manx Norton 500 cc engine. In recognition for Redman's assistance, Love allowed Redman to ride his Triumph Grand Prix including use of his riding gear for his first racing experiences.

Redman acquired more experience on his home tracks, culminating in winning the 350 cc Rhodesian Championship, after which he aspired to European racing, starting at Brands Hatch in the company of Geoff Duke and a young, rising Mike Hailwood. After changing his riding style to better-suit the European circuits, Redman achieved some success, but retired from motorcycle racing and returned to Rhodesia in 1959. Still wanting to race, Redman returned to Europe where he hoped to secure a contract riding for Walter Kaaden's MZ team in 125 cc and 250 cc classes. He unexpectedly gained factory rides in selected races with Honda for part of the 1960 season due to an injury suffered by regular rider Tom Phillis, and became himself contracted for the 1961 season.

Redman would go on to claim four consecutive 350cc World Championships from 1962 to 1965. In 1962 and 1963 he claimed double championships winning both the 250cc and 350cc World Championships. After being injured at the 1966 Belgian Grand Prix, Redman made the decision to retire.

Redman was also a six-time Isle of Man TT winner, taking double wins in 1963, 1964 and 1965 in the Lightweight & Junior TT Races. He achieved a total of 45 Grand Prix victories. Redman was awarded the MBE for his achievements.

Personal life
In 1966, Jim Redman published a book about his racing career, Wheels of Fortune. In 2013, he published his book, Jim Redman: Six Times World Motorcycle Champion – The Autobiography.

Grand Prix motorcycle racing results 

(key) (Races in italics indicate fastest lap)

† The 1963 350cc Japanese Grand Prix was a non-championship event.

References

External links

Redman images at Roy Hesketh Circuit motorcycle gallery

1931 births
Living people
Rhodesian motorcycle racers
500cc World Championship riders
350cc World Championship riders
250cc World Championship riders
125cc World Championship riders
Isle of Man TT riders
Members of the Order of the British Empire
English motorcycle racers
British emigrants to Rhodesia
White Rhodesian people
250cc World Riders' Champions
350cc World Riders' Champions